Blackmore, Hook End and Wyatts Green is a civil parish in the Brentwood borough of Essex, England.  According to the 2001 census it had a population of 3,082, reducing slightly to 3,040 at the 2011 census.

Blackmore Poor 
Under the Poor Law of 1834, Blackmore became part of the Ongar Union.

Blackmore Parish

The parish includes the ancient' village of Blackmore, along with its former hamlets of Hook End and Wyatts Green, that both now have larger populations than the original settlement.

History 
The parish was formerly simply Blackmore but was renamed to "Blackmore, Hook End and Wyatts Green" on 30 September 1998.

References

Borough of Brentwood
Civil parishes in Essex